Eftekhari (lit. "honorary") is an Iranian surname which can also be found in the Iranian diaspora. Notable people with the surname include:

 Akbar Eftekhari (born 1943), former Iranian footballer
 Ali Eftekhari (born 1964), former Iranian footballer
 Ali Reza Eftekhari (born 1958), Iranian vocalist of Iranian classical and popular music
 Amir Eftekhari (born 1964), former Iranian footballer
 Jalil Eftekhari (born 1965), Iranian former cyclist
 Laleh Eftekhari (born 1959), Iranian conservative politician and former member of the Parliament of Iran
 Nazie Eftekhari (born 195?), Iranian-American health care chief executive

References 

Persian-language surnames
Surnames from nicknames